Hannah Ibrahim Deifallah Al-Kousheh (born 21 January 1997), known as Hannah Kousheh, is an American-born Jordanian footballer who plays as a midfielder. She has been a member of the Jordan women's national team.

Early life
Kousheh hails from Cedar Rapids, Iowa.

References 

1997 births
Living people
Jordanian women's footballers
Jordan women's international footballers
Women's association football midfielders
American women's soccer players
Soccer players from Iowa
Sportspeople from Cedar Rapids, Iowa
American people of Jordanian descent
Iowa Hawkeyes women's soccer players